Herbert Sander (21 August 1879 – 18 November 1947) was a Danish fencer. He competed at the 1906 and 1908 Summer Olympics.

References

1879 births
1947 deaths
Danish male fencers
Olympic fencers of Denmark
Fencers at the 1906 Intercalated Games
Fencers at the 1908 Summer Olympics
Sportspeople from Frederiksberg